Sodium aluminium sulfate is the inorganic compound with the chemical formula NaAl(SO4)2·12H2O  (sometimes written Na2SO4·Al2(SO4)3·24H2O).  Also known as soda alum, sodium alum, or SAS, this white solid is used in the manufacture of baking powder and as a food additive. Its official mineral name is alum-Na (IMA symbol: Aum-Na).

Properties
Like its potassium analog, sodium aluminum sulfate crystallizes as the dodecahydrate in the classical cubic alum structure.

Sodium alum is very soluble in water, and is extremely difficult to purify. In the preparation of this salt, it is preferable to mix the component solutions in the cold, and to evaporate them at a temperature not exceeding 60 °C. 100 parts of water dissolve 110 parts of sodium alum at 0 °C, and 51 parts at 16 °C.

Production and natural occurrence
Sodium aluminum sulfate is produced by combining sodium sulfate and aluminium sulfate.  An estimated 3000 ton/y (2003) are produced worldwide. 

The dodecahydrate is known in mineralogy as alum-(Na). Two other rare mineral forms are known: mendozite (undecahydrate) and tamarugite (hexahydrate).

Uses
In the US, some brands combine sodium aluminum sulfate with sodium bicarbonate and monocalcium phosphate in formulations of double acting baking powder. Kawahara et al 1994 noted that aluminum is “a suspected risk factor in Alzheimer's disease” and that “aluminum directly influences the process of Alzheimer′s disease”.

Sodium alum is also used as an acidity regulator in food, with E number E521.

Sodium alum is also a common mordant for the preparation of hematoxylin solutions for staining cell nuclei in histopathology.

It is also used as a flocculant in water treatment and disinfection, but its relatively crude, caustic action makes it more suitable for industrial applications.

References

Aluminium compounds
Sodium compounds
Sulfates
Double salts
E-number additives